Klondike is an unincorporated community in Alexander County, Illinois, United States. Klondike is located along Illinois Route 3 northwest of Cairo.

Education
It is in the Cairo School District.

References

Unincorporated communities in Alexander County, Illinois
Unincorporated communities in Illinois
Cape Girardeau–Jackson metropolitan area